Pfungen railway station is a railway station in the Swiss canton of Zurich and municipality of Pfungen. Prior to the 2014 timetable change the station was called Pfungen-Neftenbach, but it was shortened as it serves Pfungen and has no connections to Neftenbach. It is located on the Winterthur to Koblenz line, and is served by Zurich S-Bahn line S41.

References 

Pfungen-Neftenbach
Pfungen-Neftenbach